The Leukersdorf Formation is a geologic formation in Germany. It preserves fossils dating back to the lower Permian period. The Chemnitz petrified forest occurs within this formation.

See also

 List of fossiliferous stratigraphic units in Germany

References

 

Permian Germany